Horse Island is an island in the Detroit River, in southeast Michigan. It is in Wayne County. Walleye can be caught there.

References

Islands of Wayne County, Michigan
Islands of the Detroit River
River islands of Michigan
Michigan populated places on the Detroit River